Cayman Islands competed at the 2022 World Aquatics Championships in Budapest, Hungary from 18 June to 3 July.

Swimming

References

Nations at the 2022 World Aquatics Championships
Cayman Islands at the World Aquatics Championships
2022 in Caymanian sport